"She's Got That Vibe" is the debut single of American R&B singer R. Kelly and band Public Announcement. It was released as the first single from Kelly's debut studio album, Born into the 90's (1992), on November 22, 1991, and was written and produced by Kelly.

The song was a top-10 hit on the US Billboard Hot R&B/Hip-Hop Songs, peaking at number seven. It also peaked at number three on the UK Singles Chart on re-release in 1994 and number 59 in the Billboard Hot 100. "She Got That Vibe" was later picked on R. Kelly's first compilation album, The R. in R&B Collection, Vol. 1.

Music video
The accompanying music video for "She's Got That Vibe" was directed by R. Kelly.

Charts

Certifications

Release history

References

R. Kelly songs
1991 debut singles
1991 songs
Jive Records singles
New jack swing songs
Songs written by R. Kelly